Somchai is a Thai given name used by males. It is the most common male given name in Thailand, with 240,000 persons using the name in 2012.

Persons with the given name Somchai include:

Somchai Chantarasamrit, cyclist
Somchai Chanthavanij, sports shooter
Somchai Chimlum, boxer
Somchai Chuayboonchum, football manager, and former footballer
Somchai Khunpluem, politician and mob boss
Somchai Limpichat, swimmer
Somchai Maiwilai, football manager
Somchai Putapibarn, boxer
Somlek Sakdikul, also known as Somchai, Thai film actor
Somchai Singmanee, footballer
Somchai Subpherm, football coach
Somchai Thingpakdee, sports shooter
Somchai Neelapaijit, human rights activist
Somchai Wongsawat, former Prime Minister of Thailand

In addition to สมชาย, a few other similar-sounding Thai names are also transcribed as Somchai. These include สมชัย, สมไชย, สมไชย์, etc., which are pronounced , with a short second syllable.

Persons with the name Somchai (สมชัย) include:
Somchai Katanyutanon, cartoonist writing under the pen name Chai Rachawat
Somchai Lyowarin, the birth name of Win Lyovarin, Thai novelist/writer

References

Thai masculine given names